Broad Street is a major thoroughfare and popular nightspot centre in Central Birmingham, England. Traditionally, Broad Street was considered to be outside Birmingham City Centre, but as the city centre expanded with the removal of the Inner Ring Road, Broad Street has been incorporated into the new Westside district of the city centre due to its position within the A4540 road.

Broad Street is also the centre of Birmingham's banking and financial centre.  It can boast region head offices of Lloyds Banking Group, Royal Bank of Scotland, Deutsche Bank, HSBC and many other banking organisations.  More than 15,000 people are employed in this sector, in this area of Birmingham.

History

Early history

In the 1500s the area which is now known as Broad Street was made up of several schools and guilds such as The Biddles/Free School, Colmore, Shillon/Smallbrooke Guild/School, Billwiggler Croft and Byngas Hall which was later to become a home for the Lloyds Bank family and subsequently Bingley Hall and then Symphony Hall/ICC after Bingley Hall burned down.

In the 1750s, Broad Street was an unnamed country path that ran across Easy Hill from Bewdley Street (now Victoria Square) and Swinford Street (now the top end of New Street) to Five Ways and on to Stourbridge and Bewdley.

However, in the following years, Easy Hill began to develop with the construction of a house by John Baskerville, a local printer and type-face designer. This led to the widening of the street which passed in front of his house. The path was soon removed and an established street was added that ran to the border of Edgbaston and, as a result of its widening, it was named Broad Street.

St Martin's Church owned land on the southern end of Broad Street, at what is now Five Ways, and began to develop the land in 1773 after the passing of an Act of Parliament. The  site was developed into an estate known as the 'Six Closes' or the 'Islington Estate' (named after Islington Row which bounded the south of the site). The Crown Inn was built in 1781, and survives in modified form. By 1795, several streets had been created according to Pye's map. One of the streets that remain from the development is Tennant Street, named after William Tennant who had the advowson of St Martin's Church. Development slowed as a result of overseas wars, but rapidly increased after the Battle of Waterloo.

Land along the street also developed and became a well established neighbourhood as a result of the connections with industry and Edgbaston, an upmarket area. In the 19th century, well established industries were established along the canals at the northern end of the street and residential properties were built at the southern end. Churches of various denominations were also built along the stretch of Broad Street, such as the Unitarian Church of the Messiah, the Roman Catholic St Peter's Church, and the Anglican Immanuel Church.

Transformation
In the 1970s and 1980s, Broad Street was still very much a suburban high street. However, one prescient early manifestation of the street's future purpose as a fashionable partying district was the Rum Runner nightclub, which from the late 1970s restyled itself after New York City's Studio 54 and later London's Blitz club. The club was best known as the original home base of major 1980s band Duran Duran. It was situated on the South side at the East end of the road from 1964 to 1987 when it was demolished.

During the 1990s, Broad Street was transformed into a dynamic convention, entertainment and nightlife quarter, centred on the International Convention Centre, which opened in 1991.

The Broad Street area is home to numerous bars and restaurants, the Brindleyplace development and cultural attractions such as the Ikon Gallery.

Three major radio stations - Free Birmingham, Capital Birmingham and 100.7 Heart FM - have their studios on the street. From 1969 to 1999 the area was a major national television production facility. The junction with Paradise Circus was home to the studios of former ITV companies ATV and Central; the studios (on the land between the Alpha Tower and the former Birmingham Municipal Bank) have since been demolished.

The area has recently been hit by a number of venue closures. In July 2008 the Sunday Mercury newspaper reported that as many as 40% of the venues between the Hyatt Hotel and Five Ways had closed, including well-known ones as the Hard Rock Cafe, Brannigans and the Waxy O'Connor's Irish-themed bar.

Traffic and transport

There is long standing concern over traffic congestion in the evenings when car drivers attracted by the nightlife are cruising the area. There was a proposal to ban cars during Friday and Saturday evenings and in 1998 there was a plan to ban cars every evening after 8.00 pm.

Broad Street is served by several National Express West Midlands bus routes. The road's only night bus service ceased in 2008.

There are plans to extend the West Midlands Metro along Broad Street to Five Ways between 2015 and 2019 with stops at Birmingham Library, Brindleyplace and Five Ways. The proposed SPRINT bus rapid transit route between Birmingham and Quinton would also serve Broad Street.

Buildings and other structures
At its northern end is:

Centenary Square, with
Baskerville House
Hall of Memory
Library of Birmingham
The old Masonic Hall, later Central Television - (demolished 2008)
The Birmingham Municipal Bank, the first municipal bank in the country, later Lloyds TSB, then bought by the council for redevelopment
The Boulton, Watt and Murdoch statue, recently re-gilded
The Birmingham Repertory Theatre
The International Convention Centre and Symphony Hall

 The Crown Inn
A tunnel (with a grade II listed Martin & Chamberlain building built on it) over the BCN Main Line canal leading to Gas Street Basin and Brindleyplace.
Hyatt Regency Birmingham Hotel.
Quayside Tower
Jury's Inn hotel

Walk of Stars

A 'Walk of Stars', similar to the Hollywood Walk of Fame, runs along the pavement on Broad Street. Ozzy Osbourne, of the Aston area of Birmingham, became the first person to be honoured when he had his brass star installed on 6 July 2007. Since then comedian Jasper Carrott, glam rocker Noddy Holder, motor racing commentator Murray Walker, the cast and crew of BBC Radio 4's The Archers, long serving Archers cast member Norman Painting and founding member of Black Sabbath, Tony Iommi have all been honoured on the street with a star. Other famous local people nominated to do the same include Frank Skinner, Cat Deeley and  Duran Duran  a group that at the start of the 1980s based themselves in the Rum Runner nightclub situated in Broad Street but which has subsequently been knocked down to make way for the Hyatt Hotel.

Future buildings
Developments planned for the street include Broad Street Tower, Regal Tower, V Building and a redevelopment of Five Ways Shopping Centre.

Westside Business Improvement District

Broad Street is part of Westside Business Improvement District (BID), voted for by local businesses to improve the area through better marketing and the introduction of a cleaner business environment.

The BID was established in July 2005 following a ballot of 262 businesses throughout the Broad Street area. With a 92% "Yes" vote, the result is the highest of all BIDs in the UK to date. The current BID term lasts for five years until March 2010. Westside Partnership Limited manage the BID with a board of directors who represent local businesses, property owners and developers, West Midlands Police, Birmingham City Council, the Leisure Forum (representing bars and clubs) and the City Centre Neighbourhood Forum.

Since the start of the BID, a number of changes have happened in the Westside area, the first of which, the introduction of a team of Street Wardens, commenced in July 2005. The wardens work closely in partnership with West Midlands Police, venue door supervisors, taxi companies and other agencies to prevent crime and to reduce the fear of crime. There is a late night Taxi Marshal scheme in operation on Friday and Saturday evenings from 10pm to 4am.

A street cleaning regime, in addition to the service provided by Birmingham City Council, has been introduced by the BID. The Broad Street area is now cleaned twice a day. Daily street washing and deep cleansing of areas requiring special attention now takes place five days per week and graffiti is removed on each shift. In addition, a pavement deep cleaning operation took place in February 2007 to remove over 150,000 pieces of chewing gum. This is all supported by the installation of 32 BID branded litter bins and a number of stainless steel bins on lampposts.

In March 2007, Birmingham City Centre was awarded the Cleanest City Award by the British Cleaning Council. It was praised for its special focus on leisure facilities and shopping areas and for the introduction of street wardens to monitor anti social activity in the area.

See also

Church of the Messiah, Birmingham
Broad Street Presbyterian Church, Birmingham

References

Brum and Brummies: Vol 2 (Chapter 3: 'The Old End' - "From Glebe Land to Working Class Heartland: The Bishopsgate Street Neighbourhood", Page 65), Carl Chinn, 2001, Brewin Books

Streets in Birmingham, West Midlands
Business improvement districts in the United Kingdom
Ladywood
Centenary Square, Birmingham